East African Safari Air Express Ltd trading as Eastafrican.com is a Kenyan airline based at Wilson Airport in Nairobi. Originally East African Safari Air, the airline was rebranded as Fly-SAX  after its purchase by the parent company of Kenyan airline Fly540, then later to Eastafrican.com

History

Before its current iteration, the airline began operations as East African Safari Air Limited, founded by Anthony A. Kegode and incorporated in May 1989. The company later changed the name of its airline operations to East African Safari Air Express.

In September 2004, East African Safari Air Express was placed into receivership. At that time, the airline was transporting an estimated 25,000 passengers per month on their various routes. East African Safari Air Express emerged from receivership and operated scheduled regional and domestic services with a fleet of McDonnell-Douglas DC-9s and a Fokker F28 that once belonged to competing Kenyan airline JetLink Express.

In November 2010, the airline was grounded in a dispute over payment of airline leases. In December 2010, low-cost carrier Fly540 purchased the assets of East African Safari Air Express, and the operation was re-branded as Fly-SAX (an ode to its former Safari Air Express moniker) in September 2012. The airline carried over the same IATA (B5) and ICAO (EXZ) airline codes to the new brand.

In April 2013, Fly540 signed an acquisition agreement with Tanzanian airline Fastjet that would see Fastjet assume Fly540's operations in order to establish Fastjet service in Kenya. This purchase leaves it unclear whether or not Fly-SAX will continue as a separate entity, as Fastjet staff have indicated that the Fly540 brand will eventually be phased out.

Destinations
As of January 2016, Eastafrican.com flies to the following destinations:

Fleet

Current fleet
The Eastafrican.com fleet consists of the following aircraft (as of August 2017):

Incidents 
On 5 June 2018, a Cessna 208 Caravan operated by Fly-SAX flying from Kitale Airport to Wilson Airport in Nairobi disappeared en route, losing contact with air traffic control while over the Aberdare Range in central Kenya. The plane had two crew and ten passengers on board.

The wreck of the Cessna C208 aircraft, registration number 5Y-CAC, was found at around 6.45 am ( GMT+3 ) by the aerial search team at Elephant Point, some 11,000 feet above sea level.

A few hours after the discovery of the wreckage, Fly-SAX confirmed through a press release on their website that there were no survivors. The total number of fatalities was 10.

References

External links
Official website

Airlines of Kenya
Airlines established in 2011
2011 establishments in Kenya